Wong Chin-chu (born 31 January 1947) is a Taiwanese educator and politician. She was a member of the Legislative Yuan from 1993 to 2001. Wong stepped down in the midst of her third term, as she was elected magistrate of Changhua County later that year. She served as magistrate until 2005. In 2007, Wong was named the minister of the Council for Cultural Affairs, a position she left in 2008 to be reelected to the legislature.

Early career
Wong earned a bachelor's degree in music from the National Taiwan Normal University. She taught at primary and middle schools for 18 years before acquiring an EMBA degree from the National Taipei University in 1999.

Political career
Wong was elected to three consecutive terms in the Legislative Yuan in the 1990s, serving from 1993 to 2001. She became the magistrate of Changhua County in 2001 after winning the 2001 Republic of China local election, serving until 2005.

In April 2004, Wong was invited to serve as the Minister of Education, but she rejected the offer. With former chairperson Lin Yi-hsiung's support, Wong ran for chairperson of the Democratic Progressive Party (DPP) in the 2006 election. She was the only female candidate in the race, but lost nonetheless.

Wong served as Chief Commissioner of the Council for Cultural Affairs from 2007 to 2008 before returning to the legislature from 2008 until 2012.

References

1947 births
Living people
Democratic Progressive Party Members of the Legislative Yuan
Changhua County Members of the Legislative Yuan
Taiwanese educators
Party List Members of the Legislative Yuan
Members of the 2nd Legislative Yuan
Members of the 3rd Legislative Yuan
Members of the 4th Legislative Yuan
Members of the 7th Legislative Yuan
Magistrates of Changhua County
National Taiwan Normal University alumni
Taiwanese Ministers of Culture
Women government ministers of Taiwan
Government ministers of Taiwan